Stanoje (Cyrillic script: Станоје) is a masculine given name of Slavic origin. The name may refer to:

Stanoje Glavaš (1763–1815), Serbian military commander
Stanoje Jocić (born 1932), Serbian footballer
Stanoje Stanojević (1874–1937), Serbian historian

See also
Stanojević
Stanojevići

Slavic masculine given names
Serbian masculine given names